Brockius nigricinctus, the spotcheek blenny, is a species of labrisomid blenny native to the western Atlantic Ocean from south Florida to Brazil. It can reach a length of  TL. This species can also be found in the aquarium trade.

References

nigricinctus
Fish of the Western Atlantic
Fish described in 1936